Ukamenia sapporensis is a moth in the family Tortricidae. It was described by Shōnen Matsumura in 1931. It is found in Japan (Hokkaido, Honshu) and the Russian Far East.

The wingspan is 10.5-14.5 mm. The ground colour of the forewings is dark grey with a rosy-red costal patch, a bluish metallic mark, a series of metallic spots and ochreous-brown streaks. The hindwings are brownish grey.

Larvae have been recorded feeding on Hamamelis japonica, Vaccinium oldhami, Quercus mongolica and Castanea crenata.

References

Olethreutinae
Moths described in 1931